D. elegantissima may refer to:
 Daphnella elegantissima, a sea snail species
 Dizygotheca elegantissima, a synonym for Schefflera elegantissima, the false aralia, a plant species native to New Caledonia

See also